Henry Satterwhite Johnson (July 10, 1900 – May 23, 1951) was an American educator and politician who served in the Virginia House of Delegates from 1942 to 1948.

References

External links 

1900 births
1951 deaths
Democratic Party members of the Virginia House of Delegates
20th-century American politicians